Sabir Yunusovich Yunusov (18 March 1909 in Tashkent – 29 November 1995 in Tashkent) was a Soviet-Uzbek chemist, known for his research in alkaloid chemistry. In 1971 he was awarded the D.I. Mendeleev Medal for doing so. He founded the Institute of the Chemistry of Plant Substances under the Academy of Sciences of the Uzbek SSR (of Uzbekistan since 1991) in 1956. He was a corresponding member of the Academy of Sciences of the USSR (of Russia since 1991) from 1958 until his death. He died and was buried in Tashkent, Uzbekistan.

References

1909 births
1995 deaths
Soviet chemists
Scientists from Tashkent
People from Syr-Darya Oblast
Uzbekistani scientists
Corresponding Members of the USSR Academy of Sciences
Corresponding Members of the Russian Academy of Sciences
Heroes of Socialist Labour
Recipients of the Order of Friendship of Peoples
Recipients of the Order of Lenin